Operation Silver was a British intelligence operation in Allied-occupied Austria which ran from 1949 to 1955 that covertly tapped into the  landline communications of the Soviet Army headquarters in Vienna. Although the operation was considered a success, the details of it were passed on to the KGB in October 1953 by George Blake, a British double agent.

The British monitoring station was disguised as a shop that sold tweed clothing. The operation ended only when Austria regained full sovereignty in 1955. 

In 1951, when the American CIA planned a similar operation in Berlin, the British revealed Operation Silver to the Americans and the two countries then jointly ran Operation Gold, an operation to tap into landline communication of the Soviet Army headquarters in Berlin using a tunnel into the Soviet-occupied zone. Blake had also informed the Soviet authorities about Operation Gold in its very beginning, and they "discovered" the tunnel in 1956.

See Also 

 Operation Gold - a more complex phone tapping operation in post WWII Berlin against the soviets

References

Operation Silver
Silver
Soviet Union–United Kingdom relations
Clandestine operations